This is a list of musical instruments used in traditional music of Assam, India.Folk instruments of assam

List

References 

Music of Assam